The 2017 UEFA Women's Under-17 Championship (also known as UEFA Women's Under-17 Euro 2017) was the tenth edition of the UEFA Women's Under-17 Championship, the annual international youth football championship organised by UEFA for the women's under-17 national teams of Europe. The Czech Republic, which were selected by UEFA on 26 January 2015, hosted the tournament.

A total of eight teams played in the tournament, with players born on or after 1 January 2000 eligible to participate. Each match had a duration of 80 minutes, consisting of two halves of 40 minutes with a 15-minute half-time.

Qualification

A total of 46 UEFA nations entered the competition (including Malta who entered for the first time), and with the hosts Czech Republic qualifying automatically, the other 45 teams competed in the qualifying competition to determine the remaining seven spots in the final tournament. The qualifying competition consisted of two rounds: Qualifying round, which took place in autumn 2016, and Elite round, which took place in spring 2017.

Qualified teams
The following eight teams qualified for the final tournament.

Notes

Final draw
The final draw was held on 7 April 2017, 10:00 CEST (UTC+2), at the Park Hotel in Plzeň, Czech Republic. The eight teams were drawn into two groups of four teams. There was no seeding, except that hosts Czech Republic were assigned to position A1 in the draw.

Venues
The tournament was hosted in four venues:
Doosan Arena, Plzeň
Na Litavce, Příbram
Stadion TJ Přeštice, Přeštice
Stadion Střelnice Domažlice, Domažlice

Match officials
A total of 6 referees, 8 assistant referees and 2 fourth officials were appointed for the final tournament.

Referees
 Julia-Stefanie Baier
 Galiya Echeva
 Ifeoma Kulmala
 Maria Marotta
 Cristina Mariana Trandafir
 Melis Özçiğdem

Assistant referees
 Anastassiya Akimova
 Ieva  Ramanauskienė
 Natalia Ceban
 Aleksandra Prus
 Vanessa Alexandra Dias Gomes
 Alexandra Theodora Apostu
 Sabrina Keinersdorfer
 Petra Bombek

Fourth officials
 Hannelore Onsea
 Lucie Šulcová

Squads
Each national team have to submit a squad of 18 players.

Group stage
The final tournament schedule was confirmed on 11 April 2017.

The group winners and runners-up advance to the semi-finals.

Tiebreakers
The teams are ranked according to points (3 points for a win, 1 point for a draw, 0 points for a loss). If two or more teams are equal on points on completion of the group matches, the following tie-breaking criteria are applied, in the order given, to determine the rankings (Regulations Articles 17.01 and 17.02):
Higher number of points obtained in the group matches played among the teams in question;
Superior goal difference resulting from the group matches played among the teams in question;
Higher number of goals scored in the group matches played among the teams in question;
If, after having applied criteria 1 to 3, teams still have an equal ranking, criteria 1 to 3 are reapplied exclusively to the group matches between the teams in question to determine their final rankings. If this procedure does not lead to a decision, criteria 5 to 9 apply;
Superior goal difference in all group matches;
Higher number of goals scored in all group matches;
If only two teams have the same number of points, and they are tied according to criteria 1 to 6 after having met in the last round of the group stage, their rankings are determined by a penalty shoot-out (not used if more than two teams have the same number of points, or if their rankings are not relevant for qualification for the next stage).
Lower disciplinary points total based only on yellow and red cards received in the group matches (red card = 3 points, yellow card = 1 point, expulsion for two yellow cards in one match = 3 points);
Higher position in the coefficient ranking list used for the qualifying round draw;
Drawing of lots.

All times are local, CEST (UTC+2).

Group A

Group B

Knockout stage
In the knockout stage, penalty shoot-out is used to decide the winner if necessary (no extra time is played).

As part of a trial sanctioned by the IFAB to reduce the advantage of the team shooting first in a penalty shoot-out, a different sequence of taking penalties, known as "ABBA", that mirrors the serving sequence in a tennis tiebreak would be used if a penalty shoot-out was needed (team A kicks first, team B kicks second):
Original sequence
AB AB AB AB AB (sudden death starts) AB AB etc.
Trial sequence
AB BA AB BA AB (sudden death starts) BA AB etc.

The penalty shoot-out in the semi-final between Germany and Norway was the first ever to implement this new system.

There is no third place match for this edition of the tournament as it is not used as a qualifier for the FIFA U-17 Women's World Cup (since expansion to eight teams).

Bracket

Semi-finals

Final

Goalscorers
3 goals

 Melissa Kössler

2 goals

 Melvine Malard
 Nicole Anyomi
 Gianna Rackow
 Olaug Tvedten
 Candela Andújar
 Clàudia Pina

1 goal

 Michaela Khýrová
 Kristýna Siváková
 Gabriela Šlajsová
 Nicole Douglas
 Lauren Hemp
 Jessica Ngunga
 Bethany May O'Donnell
 Aimee Palmer
 Poppy Pattinson
 Maëlle Lakrar
 Laurène Martin
 Sydney Lohmann
 Sjoeke Nüsken
 Lena Oberdorf
 Lea Schneider
 Verena Wieder
 Jill Baijings
 Kerstin Casparij
 Romée Leuchter
 Williënne ter Beek
 Lynn Wilms
 Rikke Bogetveit Nygård
 Jenny Kristine Røsholm Olsen
 Malin Sunde
 Carla Bautista
 Rosa Márquez
 Eva Navarro
 Lorena Navarro
 Berta Pujadas

Team of the Tournament

Goalkeepers
 Justine Lerond
 Stina Johannes

Defenders
 Maëlle Lakrar
 Andrea Brunner
 Lisa Doorn
 Malin Sunde
 Laia Aleixandri
 Rosa Otermin Abella

Midfielders
 Lauren Hemp
 Selma Bacha
 Sydney Lohmann
 Sjoeke Nüsken
 Lena Oberdorf
 Jill Baijings
 Olaug Tvedten

Forwards
 Melissa Kössler
 Candela Andújar
 Clàudia Pina

References

External links

Czech Republic 2017, UEFA.com

 
2017
Women's Under-17 Championship
2017 Uefa Women's Under-17 Championship
2017 in women's association football
2016–17 in Czech football
2017 in youth association football
May 2017 sports events in Europe